KKGL (96.9 FM, "The Eagle") is a commercial radio station located in Nampa, Idaho that serves the Boise area.  KKGL airs a classic rock format.  This station is also an affiliate for the Bob and Tom Show.

History

Top 40 (1977-1982) 
The station signed on the air in February 1977 as KUUZ with a top 40 format.

MOR (1982-198?) 
In 1982 the station changed their call letters to KBNY and aired a middle-of-the-road (MOR) format.

Adult contemporary (198?-1987) 
The station later switched to an adult contemporary format. In 1986, the call letters were changed to KFML.

Oldies (1987-1991) 
In 1987 the call letters were changed to KLCI and by 1989 the format was changed to oldies

Adult contemporary (1991-1994) 
The format changed to adult contemporary by 1991.

Classic rock (1994-present)
KLCI switched to playing only classics as “Classic Rock 97” by 1993. In the mid 1990s, KLCI rebranded as “B96.9, Boise’s Best Rock”. In 1997, the station changed its name to “96.9 The Eagle” KKGL.

External links

KGL
Cumulus Media radio stations
Classic rock radio stations in the United States
Radio stations established in 1977